The Two Year Old Produce Stakes was a greyhound competition held throughout Great Britain for greyhounds bred only in Great Britain. Many tracks held their own version of the event, but due to the emergence of many new competitions with more prize money on offer they were discontinued. 

The Oxford Stadium event was held from 1957 until 1975.

Past winners

Venue
1957-1975 Oxford

References

External links
British Greyhound Racing Board

Greyhound racing competitions in the United Kingdom
Sport in Oxfordshire
Recurring sporting events established in 1957